Back with a Bong! is the second album from New York hardcore punk band Murphy's Law.

It was released in 1989 on Profile Records and subsequently re-released on Another Planet Records in 1994 with the previous self-titled album on the same disc.

It came three years after the previous album and the band had undergone somewhat of a transformation with Jimmy Gestapo the only remaining member.

Alex Morris had been replaced on guitar by Todd Youth – previously of fellow New York hardcore bands, Agnostic Front and Warzone, and later of Danzig. Chuck Valle replaced Pete Martinez on bass, and Doug E. Beans took over drumming duties from Petey Hines.

They followed this album with 1991's Best of Times, 1993's Good For Now, and 1996's Dedicated – so called because Chuck Valle was killed in 1994.

Overview
Although the band had entered the limelight a bit more since their self-titled 1986 album, the music was still noticeably hardcore punk. Far from taking in influences from the crossover thrash scene, they instead opted for introducing more eclectic sounds such as ska and brass instruments.

Track listing
All songs written by J Drescher, C Valle, T Schofield, and D Thompson
"Intro"	–	1:42
"Panty Raid"	–	2:57
"Yahoo!"	–	1:46
"Attack of the Killer Beers"	–	2:40
"Cavity Creeps"	–	1:25
"Ska Song"	–	2:20
"Quest for Herb"	–	2:38
"America Rules"	–	1:31
"Rage"	–	2:04
"Wall of Death"	–	1:43
"Secret Agent S.K.I.N."	–	2:02
"Push Comes to Shove"	–	2:03
"Bong"	–	4:33

Personnel
 Jimmy "Gestapo" Drescher – vocals
 Todd "Youth" Schofield – guitar
 Chuck Valle – bass
 Doug "E. Beans" Thompson – drums
 Horns – courtesy of Columbia Records – arranged and played by
 Angelo Moore
 Christopher Dowd
 Walter Kirby III
 Narration of "Secret Agent S.K.I.N." by Frenchie
 Recorded at Dreamland Recording Studio and Chung King "House of Metal", New York, U.S.
 Produced by Murphy's Law
 Assisted by Jack Flanagan, Bob Musso, Gary Miller and Nick Light
 Engineered by Dave Cook, Martin Kunitz and Chuck Valle
 Horns recorded at Blue Canyon Recorders, Los Angeles, U.S. – engineered by Craig Doubet
 Mastered by Howie Weinberg at Masterdisk, New York, USA
 Re-mastered for re-issue by Alan Douches at West West Side Studios

References

External links
Murphy's Law official website

1989 albums
Profile Records albums
Murphy's Law (band) albums
Albums recorded at Chung King Studios